Maheswaran is a Tamil male given name. Due to the Tamil tradition of using patronymic surnames it may also be a surname for males and females. The female variant of Maheswaran is Maheswari.

Etymology
The name stands for "Grand Lord", see Mahesh.

Notable people

Murugesapillai Maheswaran (born 1939), mathematician, astrophysicist and educator
Panagoda Maheswaran (born 1955), Sri Lankan Tamil militant
T. Maheswaran (1966–2008), assassinated Sri Lankan Tamil MP
Vijayakala Maheswaran (born 1972), Sri Lankan MP; wife of T. Maheswaran
Uma Maheswaran (1945–1989), Sri Lankan Tamil militant

Fictional characters 
Connie Maheswaran, a character in the TV series Steven Universe

See also
 

Tamil masculine given names